The Highest Selling New Zealand Artist is an Aotearoa Music Awards award which is presented annually to the New Zealand artist with the highest sales in the awards period. The awards are presented annually by Recorded Music NZ at the annual New Zealand Music Awards. Nominations are not normally announced in this category. Before 2018, the Highest Selling New Zealand Album and Highest Selling New Zealand Single awards were presented.

Highest Selling New Zealand Album 

 While nominees are not normally announced for this category, in 2015 nominees were included. The non-winning nominees for 2015 were: Broods – Evergreen, Devilskin – We Rise, Lorde – Pure Heroine and Six60 – Six60.

Highest Selling New Zealand Single 

 While nominees are not normally announced for this category, in 2015 nominees were included. The non-winning nominees for 2015 were: Broods – "Mother & Father", Lorde – "Yellow Flicker Beat", Six60 – "Special" and  Six60 – "So High".

References 

Aotearoa Music Awards
Awards established in 2003